The Vanuatu Handball Association, (FVH) is the governing body for the sport of handball and beach handball in Republic of Vanuatu. FVH is member of the Oceania Continent Handball Federation (OCHF) and the International Handball Federation (IHF) since 1990.

National teams
 Vanuatu men's national handball team
 Vanuatu women's national handball team
 Vanuatu men's national junior handball team

See also
 Oceania Men's Handball Nations Cup
 Oceania Handball Challenge Trophy
 Pacific Handball Cup

National members of the Oceania Continent Handball Federation
Sport in Vanuatu
Sports organizations established in 1990
Handball governing bodies
Handball in Vanuatu
National members of the International Handball Federation